Kangla Tarbo 1 (height 6315 m) is a mountain in the Himalayas, in the Lahaul and Spiti district of Himachal Pradesh, India.

It was first climbed in 2000 by an expedition from the Irish Mountaineering Club.

References

Mountains of Himachal Pradesh
Himalayas
Geography of Lahaul and Spiti district